Theodore McCarty (October 10, 1909 – April 1, 2001) was an American businessman who worked with the Wurlitzer Company and the Gibson Guitar Corporation. In 1966, he and Gibson Vice President John Huis bought the Bigsby Electric Guitar Company. At Gibson he was involved in many guitar innovations and designs between 1950 and 1966.

Life and career
Born in Somerset, Kentucky in 1909, McCarty earned a degree in engineering from the University of Cincinnati before joining the Wurlitzer Company in 1936. He stayed with Wurlitzer until 1948 when he was hired by Gibson. Brach's Candy also wanted to hire him.

McCarty was named vice president of the Gibson Guitar Corporation in 1949, then president in 1950. He remained president until 1966. This period became known as Gibson's golden age of electric guitars.

The Gibson Les Paul was designed during his time with the company. McCarty sought to create a hybrid design that would combine the sustain of a solid-body electric guitar with the warmth of a hollow-body guitar. The ES-335 was created as a semi-hollow with a central block running the length of the guitar and hollow wings. McCarty was also responsible for the development of the Tune-o-matic bridge system, the humbucking pickup, and the Explorer, Flying V, Moderne, SG and Firebird guitars. Like Leo Fender, McCarty never played the guitar. He instead talked with every guitarist he could in order to find out what guitar players were interested in.

In addition to his numerous inventions, he also is responsible for increasing Gibson's production from 5,000 guitars a year to more than 100,000. This increase in production allowed Gibson to grow from 150 employees to over 1,200 employees during McCarty's 18-year span as president. In 1966, McCarty retired from Gibson and became president of Bigsby Electric Guitars.

In April 2000 McCarty became the first person interviewed for the National Association of Music Merchants Oral History program, a video collection of interviews with pioneers of the music industry.

Death

McCarty died in April 2001, at the age of 91.

Collaboration
McCarty became the mentor of Paul Reed Smith. Smith found out about McCarty during a visit to the US Patent office in the early 1980s, where he kept noticing McCarty's name among Gibson's patents. Smith later hired McCarty as a consultant, and credits his experience with McCarty as a defining moment in his company. In 1994, Paul Reed Smith's company PRS Guitars, launched the McCarty model as a tribute to McCarty. Previously, no instrument or company ever bore his name.

The "Theodore" Guitar
A sketch of a guitar drawn in 1957 by Ted McCarty, was manufactured into a real instrument. The Theodore is an electric guitar made by Gibson. According to the Gibson website, only 318  models have been made. The guitar features 2 P-90 Pickups and 2 tone and volume knobs. Its headstock design is very similar to the Gibson Explorer's headstock.

References

Further reading
 Carter, Walter. Gibson Guitars: 100 Years of an American Icon. Los Angeles: General Pub. Group, 1994.
 Hembree, Gil.Gibson Guitars: Ted McCarty's Golden Era: 1948–1966. Hal Leonard Corp, 2007.

External links
Ted McCarty NAMM Oral History Program Interview (2000)

Business Wars from Wondery (June 24, 2019) - Season 24 Episode 2 - Gibson vs Fender “Loud and Clear”

1909 births
2001 deaths
American musical instrument makers
Gibson Brands
Wurlitzer